Pepper LIVE DVD is a DVD by Pepper that was filmed over the course of two sold-out 2004 performances at the L.A.'s Troubador night club.

The DVD was released on March 8, 2005 through Volcom Entertainment.

Tracks
 "7 Weeks"
 "Stone Love"
 "Back Home"
 "B.O.O.T."
 "Use Me"
 "Tongues"
 "Feels Good"
 "Tradewinds"
 "Your Way"
 "Punk Rock Cowboy"
 "Stormtrooper"
 "Too Much"
 "Ashes"
 "Love Affair"
 "Give It Up"
 "Sitting on the Curb"
 "The Arena"
 "Naughti Girl"

2005 video albums
Pepper (band) albums